Club Atlético Boca Unidos (mostly known simply as Boca Unidos) is an Argentine football  and basketball club from Corrientes Province. The football squad currently plays in the Primera B Nacional, the second division of Argentine football league system.

At the end of the 2006–07 season Boca Unidos promoted from Torneo Argentino B to the Torneo Argentino A via play-off. On 21 June 2009, the squad won another promotion which allowed it to play in the Primera B Nacional, where has remained since.

Players

Current squad

Managers
 Luis Medero (2011–12)
 Paolo Montero (2016–)

Honours
Torneo Argentino A (1): 2008–09

References

External links

 Official website

 
Football clubs in Corrientes Province
Association football clubs established in 1927
Basketball teams established in 1927
Basketball teams in Argentina
1927 establishments in Argentina